Vrysinas(βρύσινας) is the archaeological site of an ancient Minoan peak sanctuary.

Geography
Aside from Chania, Vrysinas is currently the westernmost discovered Minoan site.

Archaeology
Vrysinas has yielded a single Linear A inscription on the fragment of a stone table.  Miniature vases were also found at Vrysinas.  Similar vases were found at Petsofas and Karphi.

An eagle talon and several boar's tusks were uniquely found at the Vrysinas peak sanctuary.

References
 Jones, Donald W. 1999 Peak Sanctuaries and Sacred Caves in Minoan Crete 

Peak sanctuaries